David Parker (born 1969) is an American optometrist and politician. He serves as a Republican member of the Mississippi State Senate, representing District 2.

Early life
David Parker was born on September 9, 1969 in Memphis, Tennessee. He was educated at Southaven High School in Southaven, Mississippi. He graduated from Christian Brothers University. He received a degree from the Southern College of Optometry.

Career
Parker works as an optometrist. He is a member of the American Optometric Association and the Mississippi Optometric Association. 

Since 2013, Parker has served as a Republican member of the Mississippi State Senate, representing District 2, which includes parts of DeSoto County, Mississippi. In the aftermath of the Charleston church shooting in June 2015, Parker called for the Confederate battle flag to be removed from the flag of Mississippi, suggesting it was divisive.

Personal life
Parker is married to Ashleigh Beckett. They have four children. They reside in Olive Branch, Mississippi. He is a member of the United Methodist Church.

References

Living people
1969 births
Christian Brothers University alumni
People from Olive Branch, Mississippi
Politicians from Memphis, Tennessee
American optometrists
Republican Party Mississippi state senators
21st-century American politicians